Kammavari Palem is a village in the Guntur district, in the state of Andhra Pradesh, India. The village was originally known as "Kammavari palem."

Villages in Guntur district